UMSA may refer to:

 Universidad Mayor de San Andrés
 Universidad del Museo Social Argentino